The Municipality of Lidcombe was a local government area in the Western region of Sydney, New South Wales, Australia. The municipality was proclaimed as the Borough of Rookwood on 8 December 1891 and was renamed to the Municipality of Lidcombe, a portmanteau of two mayor's names, in order to differentiate itself from the expanding necropolis, from 15 October 1913. It included the modern suburbs of Rookwood, Lidcombe, Homebush Bay (now Sydney Olympic Park and Wentworth Point), Berala and parts of Newington, Silverwater, Homebush West and Regents Park. From 1 January 1949, the council was amalgamated into the Municipality of Auburn, with the passing of the Local Government (Areas) Act 1948.

Council history

Early years and development
The area was first incorporated on 8 December 1891, when the Governor of New South Wales, The Earl of Jersey, proclaimed the "Borough of Rookwood". The first council was elected on 16 February 1892, with nine aldermen elected at-large.

The Council first met on 24 February 1892, at Gormley's Hall, with Richard Slee having already been elected the first mayor, and William de Burgh Hocter, former Town Clerk of The Glebe, appointed first Town Clerk in March 1892. On 28 November 1896, the foundation stone for the new Town Hall, on Church Street, was laid by the Mayoress, Mrs Lidbury. Designed by J. B. Alderson and built by William Peter Noller of Parramatta, the Town Hall was completed in 1897. From 28 December 1906, following the passing of the Local Government Act, 1906, the council was renamed as the "Municipality of Rookwood".

Name change
With the continuing growth of the necropolis in the council area, opinion within the council and ratepayers that the "Rookwood" name was now too closely associated with the cemetery was growing. Several names were suggested, but council did not settle on a choice until in July 1913 when Henry R. Hoebey wrote to council suggesting the name "Lidcombe", a portmanteau of two mayor's names, Frederick Lidbury and Henry Larcombe, noting: 

This name change was accepted by the NSW Department of Public Works and gazetted on 22 October 1913. With the name change, the council also wrote to the state government advising them that the usage of "Necropolis" to refer to the cemetery was now undesirable, favouring "Rookwood" for the cemetery now only. With the passing of the "Rookwood" name the Evening News observed:

Later history
By the end of the Second World War, the NSW Government had realised that its ideas of infrastructure expansion could not be effected by the present system of the patchwork of small municipal councils across Sydney and the Minister for Local Government, Joseph Cahill, following the recommendations of the 1945–46 Clancy Royal Commission on Local Government Boundaries, passed a bill in 1948 that abolished a significant number of those councils. Under the Local Government (Areas) Act 1948, Lidcombe Municipal Council merged with the Municipality of Auburn, which covered the border to the west.

Mayors

Town Clerks

References

Further reading

Lidcombe
Lidcombe
Lidcombe
Lidcombe